Ska Brewing Company is a brewery founded in 1995 by Bill Graham and Dave Thibodeau in Durango, Colorado, United States. Since 2008, the brewery has been located in its current Bodo Industrial Park location. Its beer names and branding revolve around ska and rude boy culture.

In March 2020, after half a decade of planning, Ska Street Brewstillery opened in Boulder, Colorado. That same afternoon it and other restaurants in the state closed due to the coronavirus.

See also

References

Further reading
 Beer in Review: Dave Thibodeau of Ska Brewing. The Denver Post.
 Ska Brewing - First Drafts. The Denver Post.

External links
Official website

Beer brewing companies based in Colorado